The Battle of San Jacinto took place on the 14 September, 1856, in Hacienda San Jacinto, Managua, Nicaragua. One hundred and sixty soldiers of the Legitimist Septemtrion Army, led by Colonel José Dolores Estrada, fought 300 Nicaraguan filibusters of William Walker, led by Lieutenant Colonel Byron Cole. The filibusters were defeated after four hours of combat, between 7:00am and 11:00am. 

The filibusters suffered 27 killed, as well as an unknown number wounded (according to Estrada), or 35 killed and 18 captured (according to Lieutenant Alejandro Eva). Nicaraguan losses totaled 28 killed and wounded. The battle marked the end of Walker's expedition to Nicaragua. 

The 14th of September, the date of the battle, is celebrated as a national holiday in Nicaragua. A column of 60 Matagalpa Indians, armed with bows and arrows, made a decisive contribution to the expedition's defeat. In 2012, the "Indios Flecheros de Matagalpa" were declared National Heroes of the Battle of San Jacinto by the Congress of the Republic of Nicaragua, which also ordered that statue be erected in their honor.

References

Conflicts in 1856
September 1856 events
1856 in Nicaragua